The Samsung SGH-t819 is a slider phone manufactured by Samsung and offered by T-Mobile. It was released in January 2008.

Features

The t819 is one of T-Mobile's 3G phones offered before the launch of their 3G network. The phone is designed to be a budget feature phone. Its major features are a 3.96 x 2.63 inch display that supports 262,000 colors, a 1.3-megapixel camera, voice dialling, a basic phone book and stereo Bluetooth. The phone is available in a "coffee brown" color.

References

Samsung mobile phones
Mobile phones introduced in 2008